Amr Ali may refer to:
Amr Ali (youth leader), leader of the April 6 Movement in Egypt
Amr Ali (wrestler), Egyptian Olympic wrestler
Amr Ali (fashion designer), founder of the London-based fashion label Bodyamr